Chylismia is a plant genus in the evening primrose family Onagraceae.

Species
The Plant List recognises 16 accepted species:
 Chylismia arenaria  
 Chylismia atwoodii  
 Chylismia brevipes  
 Chylismia cardiophylla  
 Chylismia claviformis  
 Chylismia confertiflora  
 Chylismia eastwoodiae  
 Chylismia exilis  
 Chylismia heterochroma  
 Chylismia megalantha  
 Chylismia multijuga  
 Chylismia munzii  
 Chylismia parryi  
 Chylismia scapoidea  
 Chylismia specicola  
 Chylismia walkeri

References

 
Onagraceae genera